Soppressata is an Italian dry salami.  Although there are many variations, two principal types are made: a  cured dry sausage typical of Basilicata, Apulia, and Calabria, and a very different uncured salame, made in Tuscany and Liguria. 
It is still part of southern Italian cultural heritage that local people (especially in the smaller rural towns)  slaughter the pig themselves and use it all, with nothing going to waste, using some parts to make cured meats including soppressata.  Soppressata is sometimes prepared using ham.

Preparation

Varieties

Soppressata di Basilicata is mainly produced in Rivello, Cancellara, Vaglio, and Lagonegro. 
Soppressata di Calabria enjoys Protected designation of origin status; the one produced in Acri and Decollatura is especially renowned.
Soppressata di Puglia from Martina Franca is also very well-known. 

Soppressata Toscana, soppressata from Tuscany, is made from the leftover parts of the pig.  First, the head is boiled for a few hours.  When it is done, it is picked of meat and skin.  All of the meat and skin, including the tongue, are chopped, seasoned, and then stuffed into a large casing.  The cooking liquid is poured in to cover the mixture and it is then hung and the cooking liquid (high in gelatin) thickens to bind everything together.  It is similar to the English brawn, Polish salceson and the German presskopf (Austrian Presswurst).

Sopressa Veneta got its name from the practice of pressing the salami between planks of wood resulting in a straight, flattened shape. The northern Italian version from Vicenza, in the Veneto region, did away with the pressed shape and has become an international favorite.

See also

 Sobrassada
 Sopressa
 Capocollo
 Mortadella
 'Nduja
 Prosciutto
 List of dried foods
 List of sausages

References

External links
 

Salumi
Italian sausages
Fermented sausages